Paul Standard (May 19, 1896 – January 1, 1992) was an American calligrapher and author, who immigrated from Russia in 1903. His books included:
 Calligraphy’s Flowering, Decay and Restoration, Society of Typographic Arts, 1947
 Our Handwriting, 1947
 Arrighi's Running Hand, 1979

References

External links
  Paul Standard, Handwriting exemplar

American calligraphers
1896 births
1992 deaths